The badminton mixed doubles tournament at the 1994 Asian Games in Hiroshima took place from 11 October to 15 October at Tsuru Memorial Gymnasium.

The South Korea duo of Yoo Yong-sung and Chung So-young won the gold in this tournament after beating another Korean pair of Kang Kyung-jin and Jang Hye-ock in the final.

Malaysia and Indonesia shared the bronze medal.

Schedule
All times are Japan Standard Time (UTC+09:00)

Results

References
Results

External links
Results

Mixed doubles